Leslie Donald Epstein (born May 4, 1938 in Los Angeles) is an American educator, essayist, and novelist. Epstein is currently Professor of English and Director of the Creative Writing Program at Boston University.

Career
Epstein was born to an American Jewish family in Los Angeles and grew up in Hollywood. His father Philip and uncle Julius were both noted screenwriters. Together, they won an Academy Award for the celebrated 1942 film Casablanca.

Epstein attended the Webb School of California, and went to Yale University. In 1960 he matriculated at Merton College, Oxford on a Rhodes Scholarship; he attained a Diploma in Social Anthropology in 1962. He returned to the United States as a graduate student in Theatre Arts at UCLA.

Epstein has written nine novels including King of the Jews (1979), about Chaim Rumkowski, head of the Judenrat of the Łódź ghetto during World War II; and Pandaemonium (1997). His San Remo Drive: A Novel from Memory (2004) was based on his childhood growing up in Hollywood in the 1940s and 50s.

Epstein's most recent novels are The Eighth Wonder of the World, published by Other Press in 2006, and Liebestod: Opera Buffa with Lieb Goldkorn, published by W. W. Norton & Co. in February 2012.

Epstein has written articles for Esquire, The Atlantic, Playboy, Harper's, The Yale Review, The Nation, The New York Times Book Review, The Washington Post and The Boston Globe. Among those articles is his essay, "Returning to Proust's World Stirs Remembrance", for the New York Times series, 'Writers on Writing' (Vol. II). In it, he defined reading Marcel Proust "ala Epstein" as reading Proust each night before bedtime; by confining the session to two pages of five minutes, he created a five-year project to complete all the volumes of A la recherche du temps perdu. His rationale: "It is not a bad idea to keep a nightly appointment with a noble mind; it has the power to purify even the most wasted day."
For more than twenty years, Leslie Epstein has been the director of the Creative Writing Program at Boston University, where he joined the faculty in 1978.  In February 2007, his play King of the Jews (not an adaptation of his earlier novel, but an independent realization of the same theme) was premiered at Boston Playwrights' Theatre to critical acclaim.

Personal life
Epstein has three children: Paul, a high school counselor; Theo, a Major League Baseball executive; and Anya, a screenwriter, who is married to Dan Futterman.

Works
P.D. Kimerakov, 1975
The Steinway Quintet: Plus Four, 1976
The Elder, 1979
King of the Jews, 1979
Regina, 1982
Goldkorn Tales, 1985
Pinto and Sons, 1990
Pandemonium, 1997
Ice Fire Water, 1999
San Remo Drive, 2003
The Eighth Wonder of the World, 2006
Liebestod, 2012

References

External links
 "Creative Writing Program Annual Faculty Reading" Video of reading, April 28, 2009

1938 births
Living people
American Zionists
Writers from Los Angeles
American male essayists
American male novelists
20th-century American male writers
21st-century American male writers
20th-century American essayists
21st-century American essayists
20th-century American novelists
21st-century American novelists
Jewish American novelists
Yale College alumni
Yale School of Drama alumni
Alumni of the University of Oxford
University of California, Los Angeles alumni
Boston University faculty
Alumni of Merton College, Oxford
21st-century American Jews
Fulbright alumni